Traceroute is a computer network diagnostic tool.

Traceroute may also refer to:
Traceroute (film), a 2016 documentary film